A gate or gateway is a point of entry to or from a space enclosed by walls. The word derived from old Norse "gat" meaning road or path; But other terms include yett and port. The concept originally referred to the gap or hole in the wall or fence, rather than a barrier which closed it. Gates may prevent or control the entry or exit of individuals, or they may be merely decorative. The moving part or parts of a gateway may be considered "doors", as they are fixed at one side whilst opening and closing like one.

A gate may have a latch that can be raised and lowered to both open a gate or prevent it from swinging. Gate operation can be either automated gate operator or manual. Locks are also used on gates to increase security. 

Larger gates can be used for a whole building, such as a castle or fortified town. Actual doors can also be considered gates when they are used to block entry as prevalent within a gatehouse. Today, many gate doors are equipped with self-closing devices that can improve safety, security, and convenience. 

It is important to choose a controlled gate closer to ensure a consistent closing speed, as well as safety and security. A self-closing gate can help prevent accidents by children or pets, particularly around swimming pools, spas, beaches and hot tubs.  A self-closing gate can also improve the security of the property by ensuring that the gate is closed and latched properly. There are various types of gate closers available, including exposed spring devices, gate closers, spring hinges, and self-closing hinges. The appropriate type of closer will depend on the weight and size of the gate, as well as other factors like speed control, weather resistance, and ADA compliance.

Purpose-specific types of gate

 Baby gate a safety gate to protect babies and toddlers
 City gate of a walled city
 Hampshire gate (a.k.a. New Zealand gate, wire gate, etc.)
 Kissing gate on footpath
 Lychgate with a roof
 Mon Japanese: gate. The religious torii compares to the Chinese pailou (paifang), Indian torana, Indonesian Paduraksa and Korean hongsalmun. Mon are widespread, in Japanese gardens.
 Portcullis of a castle
 Race gates a gate used checkpoints on race tracks.
 Slip gate on footpaths
 Turnstile
 Watergate of a castle by navigable water
 Slalom skiing gates
 Wicket gate

Image gallery

See also
 Barricade
 Boom barrier (a.k.a. boom gate)
 Border
 Gate tower
 Gopuram
 Leave the gate as you found it
 Portal (architecture)
 Portcullis
 Threshold (disambiguation)
 Triumphal arch
 List of scandals with "-gate" suffix
 Watergate, as used in politics

References

External links

 
Doors
Fortification (architectural elements)
Garden features